The 75th Directors Guild of America Awards, honoring the outstanding directorial achievement in feature films, documentary, television and commercials of 2022, were presented on February 18, 2023. The ceremony was hosted by Judd Apatow, who previously hosted the ceremonies in 2018, 2020 and 2022. The nominations for the television and documentary categories were announced on January 10, 2023, while the nominations for the feature film categories were announced on January 11, 2023.

Winners and nominees

Film

Television

Commercials

Lifetime Achievement in Television
 Robert A. Fishman

Frank Capra Achievement Award
 Mark Hansson

Franklin J. Schaffner Achievement Award
 Valdez Flagg

References

External links
 

Directors Guild of America Awards
2022 film awards
2022 television awards
2022 in American cinema
2022 in American television
2023 awards in the United States